Myron Carlton "Tiny" Bradshaw (September 23, 1907 – November 26, 1958) was an American jazz and rhythm and blues bandleader, singer, composer, pianist, and drummer.  His biggest hit was "Well Oh Well" in 1950, and the following year he recorded "The Train Kept A-Rollin'", important to the development of rock and roll; he co-wrote and sang on both records.

Early years
Myron Carlton Bradshaw was born in Youngstown, Ohio, the son of Cicero P. Bradshaw and his wife Lillian Boggess.  Bradshaw graduated from high school in Youngstown.  After graduating from Wilberforce University with a degree in psychology, Bradshaw turned to music for a living. In Ohio, he sang and played drums with Horace Henderson's campus oriented Collegians. Then, in 1932, Bradshaw relocated to New York City, where he drummed for Marion Hardy's Alabamians, the Charleston Bearcats (later the Savoy Bearcats), and the Mills Blue Rhythm Band, and sang for Luis Russell.

Bandleader

In 1934, Bradshaw formed his own swing orchestra, which recorded eight sides in two separate sessions for Decca Records that year in New York City.  The band's next recording date was in 1944 for Manor Records, at which point its music was closer to rhythm and blues.  He recorded in 1947 for Savoy Records.

The band recorded extensively for the rhythm and blues market with King Records between late 1949 and early 1955, and had five hits on the Billboard R&B chart.  His most successful record at the time was "Well Oh Well", which reached no.2 on the R&B chart in 1950 and stayed on the chart for 21 weeks.  Two follow-ups, "I'm Going To Have Myself A Ball" (no.5, 1950) and "Walkin' The Chalk Line" (no.10, 1951) also made the chart before a break of almost two years.

What is now Bradshaw's best known recording was "The Train Kept A-Rollin'" (1951) — not a chart hit at the time — which passed from rhythm and blues history into rock's legacy. The song was recorded by Johnny Burnette & The Rock 'N' Roll Trio in 1956 and by The Yardbirds with Jeff Beck in 1965.  It was covered again by Aerosmith in 1974 and by Motörhead in 1977. Furthermore, Jimmy Page reported in an interview that the first song played, at the very first rehearsal of what would become the English rock band Led Zeppelin was "The Train Kept A-Rollin'".

Bradshaw returned to the R&B chart in 1953 with "Soft" (no.3), an instrumental later recorded by Bill Doggett, and "Heavy Juice" (no.9).  Both of these 1953 hits featured Red Prysock on tenor saxophone.

Bradshaw's later career was hampered by severe health problems, including two strokes, the first in 1954, that left him partially paralyzed. He made a return to touring in 1958.  His last session that year resulted in two recordings, "Short Shorts" and "Bushes" (King 5114), which proved an unsuccessful attempt to reach out to the emerging teenage record market.

Weakened by the successive strokes as well as the rigors of his profession, Bradshaw died in his adopted hometown of Cincinnati from another stroke in 1958. He was 51 years old.

Legacy

Bradshaw is remembered for a string of rhythm and blues hits. As a bandleader, he was an invaluable mentor to important musicians and arrangers including Sil Austin, Happy Caldwell, Shad Collins, Wild Bill Davis, Talib Dawud, Gil Fuller, Gigi Gryce, Big Nick Nicholas, Russell Procope, Red Prysock, Curley Russell, Calvin "Eagle Eye" Shields, Sonny Stitt, Noble "Thin Man" Watts, and Shadow Wilson.

Discography

Singles
Decca Records
194 The Darktown Strutter's Ball/The Sheik Of Araby (1934)
236 Ol' Man River/I'm A Ding Dong Daddy (1934)
317 Mister, Will You Serenade/She'll Be Coming 'Round The Mountain (1934)
456 Shout, Sister, Shout/I Ain't Got Nobody (1934)

Regis Records
1010 Straighten Up And Fly Right/Bradshaw Bounce (1944)
1010 After You've Gone/Salt Lake City Bounce (1944)
1011 After You've Gone/Salt Lake City Bounce [reissued with the correct number] (1944)

Manor Records
1052 Butterfly/Schoolday Blues (aka P.S. 81 Blues) (1945)
1082 After You've Gone/Salt City Bounce [reissue of Regis 1011] (1945)
1147 V-2/I Found Out Too Late (1946)
1149 Salt Lake City Bounce/After You've Gone [reissued with the correct title] (1946)
1181 Bride And Groom Boogie/Six Shooter Junction (1946)

Savoy Records
650 These Things Are Love/I've Been Around (1947)
655 Take The Hands Off The Clock/If I Had A Million Dollars (1947)

King Records
4337 Teardrops/Gravy Train (1949)
4357 Well Oh Well/I Hate You (1950)
4376 Boodie Green/After You're Gone (1950)
4397 I'm Going To Have Myself A Ball/Butterfly (1950)
4417 Breaking Up The House/If You Don't Love Me, Tell Me So (1950)
4427 Walk That Mess/One, Two, Three, Kick Blues (1950)
4447 Two Dry Bones On The Pantry Shelf/Brad's Blues (1951)
4457 Bradshaw Boogie/Walkin' The Chalk Line (1951)
4467 I'm A High Ballin' Daddy/You Came By (1951)
4487 T-99/Long Time Baby (1951)
4497 The Train Kept A-Rollin'/Knockin' Blues (1951)
4537 Mailman's Sack/Newspaper Boy Blues (1952)
4547 Lay It On The Line/Rippin' And Runnin' (1952)
4577 Soft/Strange (1952)
4621 Heavy Juice/The Blues Came Pouring Down (1953)
4647 Free For All/Off And On (1953)
4664 Later/South Of The Orient (1953)
4687 Ping Pong/Powder Puff (1953)
4713 Overflow/Don't Worry 'Bout Me (1954)
4727 The Gypsy/Spider Web (1954)
4747 Stack Of Dollars/Cat Fruit (1954)
4757 Light/Choice (1954)
4777 Cat Nap/Stomping Room Only (1955)
4787 Pompton Turnpike/Come On (1955)
5114 Short Shorts/Bushes (1958)

Compilations
Walk That Mess! The Best Of The King Years Westside #WESA-824 (1998)	
The EP Collection...Plus See For Miles #SEECD-703 (1999)	
The Chronological Tiny Bradshaw 1934-1947 Classics (Blues & Rhythm Series) #5011 (2002)
The Chronological Tiny Bradshaw 1949-1951 Classics (Blues & Rhythm Series) #5031 (2002)	
Breaking Up The House Proper Pairs #PVCD-101 (2002)	
Well Oh Well: The Very Best Of Tiny Bradshaw Collectables #2880 (2004)	
Heavy Juice: The King Recordings 1950-55 Rev-Ola #CRBAND-3 (2006)

References

External links
 Singles discography

1907 births
1958 deaths
American jazz drummers
American jazz bandleaders
American jazz singers
American jazz pianists
American male pianists
Jump blues musicians
Wilberforce University
Musicians from Cincinnati
Musicians from Youngstown, Ohio
Decca Records artists
Savoy Records artists
King Records artists
Manor Records artists
20th-century American singers
20th-century American drummers
American male drummers
20th-century American pianists
Jazz musicians from Ohio
20th-century American male musicians
American male jazz musicians
Savoy Bearcats members